Bohomandji is a village in the Lobaye region in the Central African Republic southwest of the capital, Bangui and near the border with the Democratic Republic of the Congo.

Nearby towns and villages include Bokanga (2.2 nm), Bobeke (1.0 nm), Wabongo (1.0 nm), Bogboua (2.2 nm), Boundara (1.4 nm), Ancien Bakani (9.0 nm) and Singa (11.0 nm). 
.

References

Populated places in Lobaye